Darko Dimitrievski (born 16 May 1993) is a Macedonian handball player who plays for Recoletas Atlético Valladolid and for the North Macedonia national handball team.

Career 
Darko started his professional career at 14 years old with MRK Vardar, where he played until he was 17 years old. The following season he was at RK Kumanovo. He made the jump to the handball elite at the age of 19 and in the 2013/14 season he made his debut with Qatar Sports Club. 

In 2014 Dimitrievski moved to Spain in BM Puerto Sagunto and in season 2014-2015 he played for CB Ademar Leon. He left Spain and joined Hungarian handball team - Csurgoi KK in season 2015-2016.

Darko returned to Macedonia and signed for RK Matalurg but left after a month to join GRK Borec so that he can get more playing time. The 2016/17 season was very successful for Darko, he scored 148 goals in 19 games. After 13 years, GRK Borec finished 6th in the league.

References

External links
DARKO DIMITRIEVSKI - Career & Statistics | EHF
El Ademar León ficha a Darko Dimitrievski - MARCA.com
http://www.gol.mk/rakomet/pet-novi-zasiluvanja-za-posilen-metalurg-slednata-sezona
http://ekipa.mk/golemo-zasiluvane-za-borets-potpisha-darko-dimitrievski/
http://24rakomet.mk/старт-на-израелска-авантура-дарко-дим/

1993 births
Living people
Macedonian male handball players
Sportspeople from Veles, North Macedonia
Macedonian expatriate sportspeople in Qatar
Macedonian expatriate sportspeople in Spain
Macedonian expatriate sportspeople in Hungary
Macedonian expatriate sportspeople in Germany
Macedonian expatriate sportspeople in Israel
Expatriate handball players
Mediterranean Games competitors for North Macedonia
Competitors at the 2018 Mediterranean Games